Oxycopis suturalis is a species of false blister beetle in the family Oedemeridae. It is found in North America.

References

Further reading

 

Oedemeridae
Beetles of North America
Taxa named by George Henry Horn
Beetles described in 1896
Articles created by Qbugbot